The Delhi or Dilli Gharana, is a tabla discipleship tradition known for being the oldest. This tradition was founded by Sidhar Khan Dhadi in the early-18th Century. The tradition is regarded for establishing a distinction from pakhawaj repertoire, "do ungliyon ka baaj" (two-finger style), and contributing improvisation conventions like peshkar and kayada. Heirs of this gharana went on to establish other traditions like Lucknow gharana, Ajrada gharana, and Farukhabad gharana.

History

Origins
Delhi Gharana was founded by Dadi in the early-18th Century. Sometimes referred to as the inventor of the tabla, Sidhar Khan Dhadi is the earliest available name associated with tabla in historical records. He was initially a pakhawaj player from the tradition of Lala Bhavanidas.

Aesthetics

Technique
Considered a moderately resonant style (like Ajrada), the Delhi gharana is classified with the "bandh baaj" (closed style) rather than the "khula baaj" (open style) of Punjab and Farukhabad.

Repertoire
Delhi gharana is reputed for its vast repertoire of kayadas.

Musicality
Delhi gharana values sound quality that:
 Avoids overuse of the Bayan.
 Light, precise strokes (bols).
 Soft and esoteric temperament and style of playing.
 Strokes like "dha," "tita," "tirakita," and "tinakena" are prominent.

Legacy
Sidhar Khan Dhadi and his descendants contributed greatly to the development of the tabla language, compositional structures of the peshkars and kayadas. Many compositions from this school are standard and introductory repertoire taught to students of all tabla gharanas.

Exponents
A few notable masters of this school are Ustad Nathu Khan (1875–1940), Gamay Khan (1883–1958), Ustad Munnu Khan (the three brothers) and Ustad Gamay Khan's son Ustad Inam Ali Khan (1924–1986), his son Gulam Haider Khan, and Asif Ali Khan, Pandit Chatur Lal (1924–1966), Ustad Latif Ahmed Khan (1942-1989) and his sons Akbar Latif Khan and Babar Latif Khan,

as well as Canadian tabla player and vocalist Cassius Khan (1974).

 Ustad Fiyaz Khan (1934–12 November 2014), Pandit Subhash Nirwan(1953-2014) and his son Suraj Nirwan, Ustad Shafaat Ahmed Khan(20 May 1954 – 24 July 2005).

18th Century
 Sidhar Khan Dhadi, founder of gharana.
 Chhote Khan, son and disciple of Siddhar Khan Dhadi.
 Hussain Khan, son and disciple of Siddhar Khan Dhadi.
 Bugara Khan, son and disciple of Chhote Khan.
 Chand Khan, son and disciple of Chhote Khan.
 Lale Masit Khan, son and disciple of Chhote Khan.
 Chajju Khan, son and disciple of Hussain Khan.
 Miyan Bakshu Ji, nephew and disciple of Siddhar Khan Dhadi. Founder of Lucknow gharana.
 Ghasit Khan, son and disciple of Siddhar Khan Dhadi.
 Shitab Ali Khan, son and disciple of Bugara Khan.
 Gulab Ali Khan, son and disciple of Bugara Khan.
 Nanne Khan, son and disciple of Bugara Khan.
 Miru Khan, disciple of Sitaab Khan. Co-founder of Ajrada gharana.
 Kallu Khan, disciple of Sitaab Khan. Co-founder of Ajrada gharana.
 Muhammad Khan, son and disciple of Shitab Ali Khan.
 Nazar Ali Khan, son and disciple of Shitab Ali Khan.
 Roshan Khan
 Toollan Khan
 Bakshu Khan
 Makkoo Khan

19th Century
 Bade Kale Khan, son and disciple of Shitab Khan.
 Chhote Kale Khan, son and disciple of Muhammad Khan.
 Langde Hussain Baksh Khan, son and disciple of Lilli Masit Khan.
 Boli Baksh Khan, son and disciple of Bade Kale Khan.
 Ghasit Khan, II, son and disciple of Langde Hussain Baksh Khan
 Nanhe Khan (1872-1940), son and disciple of Langde Hussain Baksh Khan. Also learned from brother, Ghasit Khan, II.
 Natthu Khan (1875-1940), son and disciple of Boli Baksh Khan.
 Gulab Khan
 Nasir Ali Khan
 Munnu Khan, son and disciple of Chhote Kale Khan.
 Feroze Khan
 Munir Khan (1863-1937), disciple of Boli Baksh Khan. Also associated with Lucknow gharana and Farukhabad gharana.
 Jehangir Khan (1869-1960s), disciple of Feroze Khan. Also learned from Abid Hussain Khan of Lucknow gharana.

20th Century
 Gami Khan (1883-1958), son and disciple of Chhote Kale Khan.
 Inam Ali Khan (1924-1986), son and disciple of Gameh Khan.
 Jugna Khan, disciple of Miyan Nanhe Khan.
 Chatur Lal (1924-1966), disciple of Haji Mohammad Khan and Hafiz Miyan.
 Ghulam Haider Khan, son and disciple of Inam Ali Khan.
 Fakir Mohammed "Peeru" Khan, disciple of Gami Khan.
 Muhammad "Tufail" Khan Narowali, disciple of Gami Khan.
 Narayanrao Indorkar, disciple of Gameh Khan and later Jehangir Khan.
 Chhamma Khan, father and guru of Shafaat Ahmed Khan.
 Asif Ali Khan, son and disciple of Abdul Hameed Khan. Also learned from Tufail Khan.
 Faiyaz Khan (1934-2014), disciple of Inam Ali Khan.
 Krishna Bisht (student of Chand khan)
 Latif Ahmed Khan (1942-1989), disciple of uncle, Gameh Khan, and Inam Ali Khan.<ref>{{Cite web|url=https://www.last.fm/music/Latif+Ahmed+Khan/+wiki|title=Latif Ahmed Khan 
 Subhash Nirwan (1953-2014)
 Shafaat Ahmed Khan (1954-2005), son and disciple of Chhamma Khan.
 Shakeel Ahmed Khan
 Shamim Ahmed Khan, nephew and disciple of Faiyaz_Khan.

21st Century

  Babar Latif Khan, 
https://www.babarlatif.com/p/babar-latif-khan-tabla-player-born-on.html?m=1

  Akbar Latif Khan, son and disciple of Latif Ahmed Khan.
 Suraj Nirwan (b. 1986), son and disciple of Subhash Nirwani.
 Cassius Khan https://www.cassiuskhan.com (b. 1974), disciple of Rukhsar Ali.

References

Tabla gharanas
Culture of Delhi